Bille is a Surname. Bille Surname is Hindu Vaishya Surname in India. Some European Christian Notable people with the surname include:

Anders Bille (1600–1657), Danish general
Beate Bille (disambiguation), multiple people
Edmond Bille (1878–1959), Swiss artist
Ejler Bille (1910–2004), Danish artist
Gaëtan Bille (born 1988), Belgian cyclist
Irene Ibsen Bille (1901–1985), Norwegian writer and playwright
Jens Bille (1531-1575), Danish courtier and compiler of a poetry manuscript, Jens Billes visebog
Joen Bille (born 1944), Danish actor
Josef Bille (born 1944), German physician
Kristina Bille (born 1986), Danish handball player
Michael Bille (1769–1845), Danish admiral
S. Corinna Bille (1912–1979), Swiss writer
Steen Andersen Bille (1751–1833), Danish admiral
Steen Andersen Bille (1797–1883), Danish admiral
Steen Bille, Danish diplomat
Svend Bille (1888–1973), Danish actor
Téclaire Bille (1988–2010), Equatoguinean footballer

Danish-language surnames